= Homeroom Diaries =

2014 novel by James Patterson

- First edition
- Author: James Patterson
- Illustrator: keino
- Language: English
- Series: Homeroom Diaries
- Genre: Graphic Novel/ Comedy
- Publisher: Little, Brown and Company
- Publication date: July 22, 2014
- Publication place: United States
- Media type: Print (hardcover)
- Pages: 272
- ISBN: 978-0316207621

Homeroom Diaries is a realistic fiction novel by James Patterson aimed at teenagers. Published in the United States by Little, Brown and Company on July 22, 2014, the book follows high-schooler Margaret Clarke, who goes by the nickname Cuckoo. When the book begins, Cuckoo is living with a foster mother after her own mother abandoned her, an incident that caused Cuckoo to have a brief stay at a mental institution.

In an interview with Publishers Weekly, Patterson said of the book, “I think that this book is my closest yet to the kind of book I always thought I’d write when I began writing ... It has some fantasy, humor, and is very human. Some heavy things happen to the kids in the book, things that happen in real life."

Homeroom Diaries has received positive reviews from critics. Publishers Weekly said, "Patterson brings the misfit theme of Middle School: The Worst Years of My Life and its sequels into edgier territory" and book blogger Miss Literati said, "Patterson has managed to write a novel that tells a honest, fun, highly entertaining read."
